Joaquín Fernández Moreno (born 31 May 1996), sometimes known as just Joaquín, is a Spanish professional footballer who plays for Valladolid as either a central defender or a central midfielder.

Club career

Almería
Born in Huércal de Almería, Almería, Andalusia, Joaquín joined UD Almería's youth setup in 2010, aged 16, after starting it out at UCD La Cañada Atlético. He made his senior debuts with the B-team in the 2012–13 season, in Segunda División B.

On 2 December 2013 Joaquín moved to Liverpool in a trial basis. He trained with the club's under-18 squad, but returned to the Rojiblancos ten days later.

On 14 October 2015 Joaquín made his first team debut, starting in a 2–1 Copa del Rey home win against Gimnàstic de Tarragona. He made his Segunda División debut on 9 January of the following year, coming on as a late substitute for Quique González in a 1–1 draw at CD Mirandés.

On 1 December 2016, after becoming a regular starter under Fernando Soriano, Joaquín renewed his contract until 2021, being definitely promoted to the main squad the following January. Ahead of the 2018–19 campaign, he was named team captain.

Valladolid
On 31 August 2018, Joaquín signed a five-year contract with Real Valladolid, newly promoted to La Liga.

References

External links

1996 births
Living people
Sportspeople from the Province of Almería
Spanish footballers
Footballers from Andalusia
Association football defenders
Association football midfielders
La Liga players
Segunda División players
Segunda División B players
UD Almería B players
UD Almería players
Real Valladolid players
Spain youth international footballers